São Paulo Catarina International Executive Airport , is a general aviation airport serving São Paulo Metropolitan Area, Brazil. 

It is owned and operated by JHSF Participações.

History
The airport is dedicated to general aviation. It was commissioned on December 16, 2019.

On June 24, 2021 the airport was granted international status.

Airlines and destinations
No scheduled flights operate at this airport.

Access

See also

List of airports in Brazil

References

External links

Airports in São Paulo (state)
Airports established in 2019